Marchese is a hereditary title of nobility.

Marchese may also refer to:
Marchese dialect, a dialect of France
Marchese (constructor), an American racecar constructor
Colle Del Marchese, a frazione (small village) in Perugia, Italy

People with the surname Marchese
Carl Marchese (1905–1984), American racecar driver
Egidio Marchese (born 1968), Italian wheelchair curler, Paralympian 2006 and 2010
Filippo Marchese (died 1982), Sicilian Mafia boss
Giuseppe Marchese (born 1962), Sicilian Mafioso and nephew of Filippo Marchese
Marisara Pont Marchese (b. 1941), Puerto Rican public figure
Rosario Marchese (born 1952), Canadian politician

See also